{{DISPLAYTITLE:C21H23NO4S}}
The molecular formula C21H23NO4S (molar mass: 385.48 g/mol, exact mass: 385.1348 u) may refer to:

 Ecadotril
 Racecadotril, or acetorphan

Molecular formulas